Ralph William Beard (February 11, 1929 – February 10, 2003) was an American professional baseball player, a right-handed pitcher whose ten-season (1947–56) pro career included 13 games pitched for the St. Louis Cardinals of Major League Baseball. Beard, a native of Cincinnati, attended the University of Cincinnati.

Beard's 13 big-league appearances included ten starting pitcher assignments, as he took a regular turn in the Cardinals' rotation during late July and August of the 1954 season. Although he lost all four decisions, he made a memorable start on July 22, 1954, against the Pittsburgh Pirates at Busch Stadium. He went 12 innings and allowed only one earned run and eight hits (including a home run by Preston Ward for the Pirates' earned run), but left the game for a pinch hitter with the score tied 2–2. He was relieved by Gerry Staley, who hurled two perfect frames and St. Louis won, 3–2, in 14 innings.

As a starter, Beard gave up 29 runs in ten efforts and 49 innings pitched, but only 21 were earned (for a 3.81 earned run average in starting assignments). All told as a Major Leaguer, he surrendered 62 hits and 28 bases on balls in 58 innings pitched, with 17 strikeouts.

Beard died in West Palm Beach, Florida, on the day before his 74th birthday.

References

External links

1929 births
2003 deaths
Allentown Cardinals players
Austin Senators players
Baseball players from Cincinnati
Cincinnati Bearcats baseball players
Columbus Cardinals players
Columbus Red Birds players
Fort Worth Cats players
Hamilton Cardinals players
Houston Buffaloes players
Lácteos de Pastora players
Lynchburg Cardinals players
Major League Baseball pitchers
Pocatello Cardinals players
St. Louis Cardinals players